Martin Pett (born October 12, 1986) is a German footballer who plays as a midfielder.

Career
Pett began his career with Hansa Rostock, and spent five years playing for the reserve team before joining Goslarer SC in 2010. A year later he returned to Hansa Rostock II, and he was promoted to the first-team in September 2013, making his debut as a substitute for Denis Weidlich in a 1–1 draw with Chemnitzer FC in the 3. Liga.

References

External links
 
 

1986 births
Living people
German footballers
FC Hansa Rostock players
3. Liga players
Association football midfielders
Sportspeople from Rostock